Henryk Krawczyk (born 1946 in Poland) is a professor and rector of Gdańsk University of Technology since 2008.

Scientific degrees 
 MS in Design Computer Architecture, GUT, 1969
 PhD in Analysis Testability of Digital Systems, GUT, 1976
 DsC in Diagnosability Conditions for Computer Distributed Systems, GUT, 1987
 Prof. granted by President of Poland, 1996

Academic functions 
 Vice director of Computer Science Institute 1998 – 1990
 Dean of Faculty of Electronics, Telecommunication and  Informatics 1991 – 1996,   2002 – 2008
 Rector of Gdańsk University of Technology 2008 – 2016
 Member of Polish Academy of Sciences since 2007

Teaching subjects 
 Computer Architecture
 System Dependability
 Software Quality Assurance
 Design Information Processing Systems
 Collaborative Computing
 Information Society Development

Research interests 
 Diagnosability of Systems and Networks
 Parallel Software Testing
 Quality Management in Software Life Cycle
 Modelling and Analysis of Negotiation Procedures
 High Performance Computing
 Service Oriented Computing

Publications 
Over 350 publications in main topics of research interests given above including papers in IEEE Trans. on Computers, Euromicro, Lecture Notes in Computer Science, chapters in books issued by Chapman and Hall, LNH Elsevier, Nova Science, Springer – Verlag and presentations in many IEEE conference proceedings and also scientific lectures given in many universities such as University of Oulu (Finland), New Hampshire University (USA), University of Basrah (Irag), Izmir University (Turkey), Autonomous University of Barcelona (Spain), Bristol University (England), Nova University of Lisbon (Portugal), Lecee University (Italy) and the book entitled Analysis and Testing of  Distributed Software Applications issued by RSP London in cooperation with John Wiley & Sons.

References

Sources 
Mazurkiewicz B. red (2014). Rektorzy i prorektorzy Politechniki Gdańskiej 1904-2014. Wydawnictwo Politechniki Gdańskiej. .

1946 births
Academic staff of the Gdańsk University of Technology
Living people